Eulithis pyropata is a moth of the family Geometridae. It is found from extreme north-eastern Europe (including Sweden and eastern Germany) to Japan and the area surrounding the Ussuri River.

The wingspan is 30–34 mm. Adults are on wing in July and August.

The larvae feed on Ribes nigrum. Larvae can be found from June to July. The species overwinters as an egg.

Subspecies
Eulithis pyropata pyropata
Eulithis pyropata elegans (Inoue, 1955)

External links
Fauna Europaea
Lepiforum.de

Cidariini
Moths of Japan
Moths of Europe
Taxa named by Jacob Hübner
Moths described in 1809